Winter in the Air is the seventh studio album and second Christmas album by David Archuleta, released on November 2, 2018. A deluxe edition was released on November 14, 2019, which included three bonus tracks "The Christmas Song", "Merry Christmas, Happy Holidays", and "Still, Still, Still (A capella)"

Background and promotion 
Archuleta started work on the album in January, while the weather was still cold in his new hometown of Nashville. In an interview with Radio.com, Archuleta revealed that he wanted to write "one of each kind of Christmas song" meaning they had to either be fun, spiritual, or wintry. This led to the creation of "Christmas Every Day", "He Is Born", and the title track "Winter in the Air".

The album was supported with a Winter in the Air Tour that began November 26 in Los Angeles and ran through December 21 in Richfield, Utah.

Track listing

Charts

References 

2018 Christmas albums
David Archuleta albums
Christmas albums by American artists
Pop Christmas albums